"The Bargain Store" is a song written and recorded by American country music artist Dolly Parton.  It was released in January 1975 as the first single and title track from the album The Bargain Store.  The song was Parton's fifth number one on the country chart as a solo artist.  The song stayed at number one for a single week and spent nine weeks on the country chart.

Content
Worn, second-hand merchandise in a discount store is used as a metaphor for a woman emotionally damaged by an ill-fated relationship. However, the song was dropped from a number of country stations' playlists when programmers mistook the line "you can easily afford the price" as a thinly veiled reference to prostitution.

Chart performance

References

Songs written by Dolly Parton
Dolly Parton songs
1975 singles
Song recordings produced by Bob Ferguson (musician)
RCA Records Nashville singles
1975 songs
Obscenity controversies in music